Dale Rudolph Siegfried Haupt (April 12, 1929 – April 3, 2018) was an American football coach who served as the defensive line coach for the Chicago Bears of the National Football League (NFL), winning a Super Bowl with them in 1985. In 1986, Haupt joined Bears defensive coordinator Buddy Ryan in leaving the team to join the Philadelphia Eagles, and was replaced by John Levra. He served the Eagles until his retirement in 1995. He joined the staff at the Coast Guard Academy in 1997, reuniting him with former Bears coach Jim LaRue. Haupt had worked with Buddy Ryan with the NFLPA Game.

Haupt died on April 3, 2018 at the age of 88.

References

1929 births
2018 deaths
Chicago Bears coaches
Philadelphia Eagles coaches
Coast Guard Bears football coaches
People from Manitowoc, Wisconsin